Gisvan may refer to:
Rowghani (disambiguation)
Gesvan (disambiguation), places in Khuzestan Province